Pilz is a German occupational surname, which means a gatherer of mushrooms, derived from the German pilz "mushroom". Variants of the name include Piltz and Pilzer. The name may refer to:

Adolf Piltz (1855–1940), German mathematician
Anders Piltz (born 1943), Swedish scholar
Andrea Pilzer (born 1991), Italian curler
Christiane Pilz (born 1975), German athlete
Estefania Pilz (born 1985), Argentine cyclist
Gerhard Pilz (born 1965), Austrian luger
Günter Pilz (born 1945), Austrian mathematician
Hans-Uwe Pilz (born 1958), German footballer
Karol Piltz (1903–1939), Polish chess player
Otto Piltz (1846–1910), German painter
Paul Zane Pilzer (born 1954), American economist
Peter Pilz (born 1954), Austrian politician
Rick S. Piltz (1943–2014), American policy analyst
Wendy Piltz (born 1956), Australian athlete
Bradley Pilz (born 1976), American film producer

R

German-language surnames
Occupational surnames
German words and phrases